Lycée Vaucanson may refer to:
 Lycée Jacques de Vaucanson in Tours
 Lycée Vaucanson in Grenoble
 Lycée Jacques Vaucanson in Les Mureaux (Paris area)